Aqua Dome Kumamoto is a multi-purpose indoor arena in Kumamoto, Kumamoto, Japan. The capacity of the arena is 6,400 and was opened in 1998.

External links 

Indoor arenas in Japan
Handball venues in Japan
Buildings and structures in Kumamoto
Sports venues in Kumamoto Prefecture
1998 establishments in Japan
Sports venues completed in 1998